Close House may refer to:

 Close House, County Durham, a village in County Durham, England
 Close House (Iowa City, Iowa), an historic mansion in Iowa City, Iowa, United States
 Close House, Northumberland, a country estate in Northumberland, England

See also
 Close House Mine, a Site of Special Scientific Interest in County Durham, England